Fifth All-Ukrainian Congress of Soviets was a congress of  Soviets (councils) of workers, peasants, Red-army-men deputies that took place in Kharkiv on February 25 - March 3, 1921.

Composition
There were 1,050 delegates out which 841 had a ruling vote. They included 851 communists.

Agenda
 General report of government of the Ukrainian SSR
 About economic development
 About electrification of Ukraine
 About organization of labor
 About reconstruction of transport
 Food issues
 Land issues
 About organization of public education
 About Soviet construction
 About ratification of the

Decisions
On all issues were adopted respective decisions. Among the most important were defined reconstruction of coal and metallurgical industries, drawn specific measures for the electrification of the Republic, regulated the use of land and others. Special attention the congress turned towards on the necessity of broad involvement of workers participation in the congress sessions.

The congress unanimously ratified the union treaty with Russian.

The congress established the Order of the Red Banner of Labor of the Ukrainian SSR.

The congress elected 155 members to the Central Executive Committee and 55 candidates.

External links
Fifth All-Ukrainian Congress of Soviets at Ukrainian Soviet Encyclopedia
Russian Revolution in Ukraine
5
Political history of Ukraine
1921 in Ukraine
History of Kharkiv
1921 in politics
Communism in Ukraine
1921 conferences